April 6 - Eastern Orthodox liturgical calendar - April 8

All fixed commemorations below are observed on April 20 by Eastern Orthodox Churches on the Old Calendar.

For April 7th, Orthodox Churches on the Old Calendar commemorate the Saints listed on March 25.

Saints

 Saint Hegesippus the Chronicler, of Palestine (c. 180)
 Hieromartyr Rufinus the Deacon, the Martyr Aquilina, and 200 soldiers with them, at Sinope (c. 249-251)
 Martyr Calliopios, at Pompeiopolis in Cilicia (304)
 Saint Serapion the Sindonite, monk, of Egypt (5th century)  (see also: March 21 and May 14)
 Saint George, Patriarch of Jerusalem (807)
 Saint George the Confessor (George the Standard-Bearer), Bishop of Mytilene, exiled to Kherson (820)

Pre-Schism Western saints

 Saint Saturninus, Bishop of Verona and Confessor (4th century)
 Hieromartyr Epiphanius, Bishop in North Africa, with Rufinus the Deacon, Donatus, and Companions – thirteen martyrs.
 Vanerable Brynach of Wales (Brenach, Bemach, Bemacus) (6th century)
 Saint Finan (Finnian) (6th century)
 Saint Goran (Guron, Goronus, Woranus), who lived at Bodmin before St Petroc (6th century)
 Saints Llewellyn (LLywelyn) and Gwrnerth, monks from Wales who lived in Welshpool and later on Bardsey (6th century)
 Saint Gibardus, Abbot of Luxeuil in France during the invasion of the Huns (ca. 888)

Post-Schism Orthodox saints

 Venerable Leucius, Abbot of Volokolamsk (1492)
 Venerable Nilus of Sora, founder of Sora Skete, Belozersk (1508)  (see also: May 7)
 Venerable Daniel of Pereyaslavl, founder of St. Daniel Monastery (1540)
 Venerable Gerasimus the Byzantine, Hieromonk, of Patmos (1770)
 Saint Gabriel, Archbishop of Ryazan and Zaraisk (1862)
 Venerable Schemamonk Agapitus the Blind, of Valaam Monastery (1905)
 Venerable Savvas the New of Kalymnos (1947)  (see also: March 25 - os; also the Fifth Sunday of Great Lent)

New martyrs and confessors

 New Hieromartyr Arcadius Dobronravov, Archpriest, of Tsivilsk, Chuvashia (1933)
 Martyr Eudocia Pavlovoy (1939)

Other commemorations

 Icon of the Mother of God "of Byzantium" (The Byzantine Icon) (732)
 Uncovering of the relics (1517) of St. Serapion, Archbishop of Novgorod (1516)
 Repose of Schemamonk Theodore of Svir (1822)
 Repose of Schemamonk Agapitus the Blind, of Valaam (1905)

Icon gallery

Notes

References

Sources
 April 7 / April 20. Orthodox Calendar (pravoslavie.ru).
 April 20 / April 7. Holy Trinity Russian Orthodox Church (A parish of the Patriarchate of Moscow).
 April 7. OCA - The Lives of the Saints.
 The Autonomous Orthodox Metropolia of Western Europe and the Americas. St. Hilarion Calendar of Saints for the year of our Lord 2004. St. Hilarion Press (Austin, TX). p. 27.
 April 7. Latin Saints of the Orthodox Patriarchate of Rome.
 The Roman Martyrology. Transl. by the Archbishop of Baltimore. Last Edition, According to the Copy Printed at Rome in 1914. Revised Edition, with the Imprimatur of His Eminence Cardinal Gibbons. Baltimore: John Murphy Company, 1916. p. 98.
 Rev. Richard Stanton. A Menology of England and Wales, or, Brief Memorials of the Ancient British and English Saints Arranged According to the Calendar, Together with the Martyrs of the 16th and 17th Centuries. London: Burns & Oates, 1892. pp. 146–149.
Greek Sources
 Great Synaxaristes:  7 Απριλίου. Μεγασ Συναξαριστησ.
  Συναξαριστής. 7 Απριλίου. ecclesia.gr. (H Εκκλησια Τησ Ελλαδοσ). 
Russian Sources
  20 апреля (7 апреля). Православная Энциклопедия под редакцией Патриарха Московского и всея Руси Кирилла (электронная версия). (Orthodox Encyclopedia - Pravenc.ru).
  7 апреля (ст.ст.) 20 апреля 2013 (нов. ст.) . Русская Православная Церковь Отдел внешних церковных связей.

April in the Eastern Orthodox calendar